The ZIS-110 is a Soviet limousine from ZIL introduced in 1946. 

The 110 was developed from the reverse engineering of a 1942 Packard Super Eight during 1944. The first five prototypes were completed by August 1945. It was made in both sedan and convertible versions.

The ZIS was rumored to use machinery from the Packard 180 assembly line which was sent to the USSR after American production ended. However, according to The Fall of the Packard Motor Car Company, there is no evidence whatsoever in the Packard archives of such a transfer. Moreover, as one of the main results of the collection of information and material of Bert Hein, there can be many current opinions within the car literature disproved.  The database includes, in addition to some pictures of commissars with Packards, a registry of existing cars and information about all ZIS versions, but particularly a point to point comparison between the products of Packard and ZIS. Therefore more likely that the top commissars, including Joseph Stalin, owned several Packards and wanted their first effort at a luxury car to be based on what is arguably one of the top cars of the 1940s.

These cars were often given away as gifts to foreign communist leaders such as Chinese leader Mao Zedong and North Korean premier Kim Il-sung. After Stalin, the ZIL 110 c cabriolet was used as a parade car for Nikita Khrushchev and this model was also given to Enver Hoxha, the lifelong president of Albania. Ho Chi Minh, the first president of North Vietnam, also received one (most likely from the Soviet Union), which can be seen on display on the grounds of his former residence in the Vietnamese capital of Hanoi.

Production ended in 1958, with total of 2,089 cars made.

Variants
ZIS-110A: Ambulance version. Produced 1948-1958.
ZIS-110B: Phaeton version. Produced 1947-1958.
ZIS-110I: ZIS-110 with GAZ-13 Chaika powertrain.
ZIS-110P: All-wheel-drive version.
ZIS-110SH: Prototype all-wheel-drive version. Four built (two based on Dodge WC51 and two based on domestic units). Produced in 1949.
ZIS-110SH: Staff car version.
ZIS-110V: Convertible version.
ZIS-115: Armored version. Also known as ZIS-110C.

References

External links
 Autogallery.ru - ZiS-110 picture gallery with technical specifications and history
 ZIS 110 Exterior and Interior in Full 3D HD (Stereoscopic 3D video of ZIS 110, YouTube)
 

ZiL vehicles
Luxury vehicles
Cars introduced in 1946
Soviet automobiles
Flagship vehicles
1958 disestablishments in the Soviet Union